Sara Peeters (born 15 February 1985) is a former Belgian racing cyclist. She finished in second place in the Belgian National Road Race Championships in 2005.

References

External links
 

1985 births
Living people
Belgian female cyclists
People from Lier, Belgium
Cyclists from Antwerp Province